The Cumberland Dam was built across the North Branch of the Potomac River at Cumberland, Maryland, for the purpose of diverting water of the river into the head of the Chesapeake and Ohio Canal. The Chesapeake and Ohio Canal Company began construction of its Dam No. 8 in 1837 and work proceeded intermittently, finally concluding in 1850. The dam impounded water over a distance of a mile, causing back water for about  up the river.  Above the dam is the mouth of Wills Creek.

Environmental Impact
In the early 1900s Wills Creek received a large quantity of industrial sewage and refuse from a paper mill, a brewery, a distillery, a cement works, a tannery, dye works, a gas plant, and a number of coal mines. As may be expected, these pollutants accumulated in the pond above the dam as if in a settling basin, especially in seasons of low water when no water passed over the crest of the dam.

Serious complaints arose from year to year prior to 1900 during the dry season, when the water, besides being unpalatable, was scarcely clean enough for laundering purposes. Of the large percentage of impurities which the water contained at such times, a portion was doubtlessly made up of sewage from the city that had backed up to the point of intake.

Much has changed since 1900 to eliminate these problems. The city's economy has made a significant transition away from manufacturing and coal production.  The city's water is filtered and supplied from other water supplies.  Its sewage is now treated.

References

Buildings and structures in Allegany County, Maryland
Buildings and structures in Cumberland, Maryland
Chesapeake and Ohio Canal
Dams in Maryland
Dams in West Virginia
Buildings and structures in Mineral County, West Virginia
Dams completed in the 19th century
United States privately owned dams